

History 
Gorno-Altaisk State University was founded in 1949  as the Pedagogical Institute. It is located in Gorno-Altaisk, Russia. In 1993 it was given the status of a classical University. At present 5,500 students and 100 postgraduates are enrolled at the University and 400 instructors work here, more than a half of them with scientific degrees.

Structure 
There are 6 Faculties and College at the University which provide training in 30 specialities:
The Faculty of Natural Science and Geographic
The Faculty of History and Philology
The Faculty of Engineering and Technology and Physics and Mathematics
The Faculty of Economics and Law
The Faculty of Psychology and Educational Sciences 
The Faculty of Altaic and Turkic Studies
The Agricultural College

External links 
Gorno-Altaisk State University Website

Buildings and structures in the Altai Republic
Universities in Siberia
Gorno-Altaysk